Trachelopachys is a genus of South American araneomorph spiders first described by Eugène Simon in 1897. Originally placed with the Corinnidae, it was moved to the Trachelidae in 2014.

Description 

Spiders in this genus have a characteristically dark, often jet black, carapace. The legs are reddish, and typically have dark annulations. As with most trachelids, species of Trachelopachys have no leg spines, however they do bear rows of short, thick, black cuspules on the distal segments of the front two pairs of legs.

Species
 it contains fifteen species throughout South America:
Trachelopachys aemulatus Gertsch, 1942 – Paraguay
Trachelopachys ammobates Platnick & Rocha, 1995 – Brazil
Trachelopachys bicolor Chamberlin, 1916 – Peru, Bolivia
Trachelopachys bidentatus Tullgren, 1905 – Bolivia
Trachelopachys caviunae (Mello-Leitão, 1947) – Brazil
Trachelopachys cingulipes (Simon, 1886) – Argentina
Trachelopachys gracilis (Keyserling, 1891) – Brazil
Trachelopachys ignacio Platnick, 1975 – Paraguay
Trachelopachys keyserlingi (Roewer, 1951) – Brazil, Paraguay, Argentina
Trachelopachys machupicchu Platnick, 1975 – Peru
Trachelopachys magdalena Platnick, 1975 – Colombia
Trachelopachys quadriocellatus (Mello-Leitão, 1939) – Bolivia, Paraguay, Argentina
Trachelopachys sericeus (Simon, 1886) (type) – Brazil, Paraguay, Argentina, Chile
Trachelopachys singularis (Caporiacco, 1955) – Venezuela
Trachelopachys tarma Platnick, 1975 – Peru

References

Araneomorphae genera
Taxa named by Eugène Simon
Trachelidae